Hunk is a nickname of:

 Harry W. Anderson (1922–2018), American businessman, art collector, and philanthropist
 Hunk Anderson (1898–1978), American College Football Hall of Fame player and college and National Football League coach
 Edgar Humphreys (1914–1944), British Second World War pilot and prisoner of war executed for participating in the "Great Escape"

Lists of people by nickname